Grasshopper Island is a British television serial for children created by Joy Whitby. It was first broadcast in 1971. It was filmed on location in London, Milford Haven and Corsica.

Premise
The series centres on three brothers, nicknamed Toughy (wants to be a soldier), Smarty (clever), and Mouse (likes cheese). Their real names are not revealed. Presumably orphaned (their parents are never seen or mentioned), they have lived with a succession of different people – 'some nice and some nasty, but no-one who they liked in particular'. Being boisterous, adventurous and imaginative, they are regularly in trouble and consequently resent their situation. Eventually they decide to run away to sea. After escaping, they hitch a ride courtesy of the bizarre Elderly Boy in his converted lifeboat. They eventually arrive on an apparently uninhabited island, where the Elderly Boy abandons them, and they set up home. After a while they discover that the island is home to the eccentric grasshopper expert Cornelius Button and his feisty housekeeper Lupus. After making friends with their new neighbours, they join forces with them to defeat the unsavoury Doctor Hopper, who wants to destroy Button's reputation and seize Grasshopper Island. Afterwards, they  decide to stay on Grasshopper Island permanently.

Characters

Smarty
The cleverest of the three brothers, so named because 'he always had answers to all sorts of questions'. His elaborate plans are not always needed, as simpler ones are often pursued by the others.

Toughy
So-called because 'he wanted to be a soldier'. He is an avid reader and is very creative, being adept at painting and drawing.

Mouse
So-called because 'he liked cheese'. He loves hats, usually sporting more than one in each episode.

Cornelius Button (Julian Orchard)
An eccentric grasshopper expert who has lived on Grasshopper Island for many years. He spends all his time obsessively studying the grasshoppers and trying to avoid being ordered around by Lupus. Many years ago, he discovered a rare grasshopper which was named the "Button's Blue" in his honour. He was also given Grasshopper Island by way of reward, and when the villainous Dr Hopper tries to have him removed, he must find another Button's Blue to keep his tenure. Button also has a sister called Amelia who is the headmistress of a girls' school and sometimes visits him. He dreads these occasions and will do anything he can to prevent them (including pretending to be a cannibal).

Lupus (Patricia Hayes)
Cornelius Button's formidable housekeeper, who has lived with him for 20 years. Even though she is Button's employee, he is often intimidated by her into doing tasks such as taking out the rubbish. Despite this, her brisk manner hides a softer side, and she is genuinely fond of Button and the boys.

Dr Hopper (Frank Muir)
A longstanding professional enemy of Cornelius Button, who concocts a scheme to have him expelled from Grasshopper Island (which naturally would then go to Hopper) unless he finds another Button's Blue, the existence of which Hopper does not believe in. He drives a pedalo and arrives at the island in the last episode, although Toughy, Smarty and Mouse soon succeed in frightening him away.

The Elderly Boy (Charles Hawtrey)
The owner of the converted lifeboat who gives the boys a lift to the island. He owns a pet dove called Cecil. He initially wants to stay with the boys, but soon leaves after finding the environment too hot and the terrain too taxing.

The Voices of Authority (all played by Tim Brooke-Taylor)
A succession of overbearing (and mostly unpleasant) characters known to Toughy, Smarty and Mouse before they leave home. They include a businessman who shouts at them for making too much noise, a matronly woman who forbids Toughy to talk with his mouth full, a barber who gives a reluctant Smarty a short back and sides because 'curls is for girls' and a grumpy taxi-driver who drives them to the docks.

Episodes

Availability
The series has been available on DVD by Grasshopper Productions (Whitby's own company) since 2008.

Book

References

External links
 Grasshopper Island at IMDb

ITV children's television shows
1971 British television series debuts
1970s British children's television series